Puch (also Romanized as Pūch; also known as Bahārestān) is a village in Khavashod Rural District, Rud Ab District, Sabzevar County, Razavi Khorasan Province, Iran. At the 2006 census, its population was 265, in 101 families.

References 

Populated places in Sabzevar County